is a Japanese voice actress from Saitama Japan who is affiliated with Enkikaku

Filmography

Television animation

Theatrical animation

Video games
 The Idolmaster Cinderella Girls (2015) (Takumi Mukai)
 Arknights (2019) (Melantha, Beehunter, Indra)
 Life Is Strange 2 (2020) (Lyra Park)

References

External links
 Official profile
 

1992 births
Living people
Japanese video game actresses
Japanese voice actresses
Voice actresses from Saitama Prefecture